Elisabeth Kristoffersen (born 23 May 1988) is a Norwegian freediver and the current president of AIDA Norway (the freediving federation of Norway). She won the silver medal in the AIDA World Championships 2007 in Maribor, with a dynamic dive to 174 meters.

Current national records 
 Dynamic Apnea with fins: 183 meters
 Dynamic Apnea without fins: 125 meters
 Static Apnea: 6 min 15 sec
 Constant Weight Apnea: 65 meters
 Constant Weight Apnea without fins: 40 meters
 Free Immersion Apnea: 55 meters

See also

References

External links 
Elisabeth Kristoffersen blog

1988 births
Living people
Norwegian freedivers